Il commissario Lo Gatto is a 1987 Italian comedy film directed by Dino Risi. It was shown as part of a retrospective on Italian comedy at the 67th Venice International Film Festival.

Cast
 Lino Banfi as Commissario Natale Lo Gatto
 Maurizio Ferrini as Agente Gino Gridelli
 Maurizio Micheli as Vito Ragusa
 Isabel Russinova as Wilma Cerulli / Maria Papetti
 Galeazzo Benti as Barone Fricò
 Renata Attivissimo as Addolorata Patanè
 Nicoletta Boris as Annunziata Patanè
 Albano Bufalini as The Pharmacist
 Alberto Capone
 Roberto Della Casa as Architetto Arcuni
 Gianni Franco as Pedretti - aka Bazooka
 Marcello Furgiele as Mario - the lifeguard
 Licinia Lentini as Mrs. Bellugi
 Armando Marra as The Barber
 Valeria Milillo as Manuela Bellugi
 Andrea Montuschi as Don Giacomo - the priest
 Gianluigi Pizzetti as Ingegner Bellugi
 Antonella Voce as Immacolata Patanè

References

External links

1987 films
1987 comedy films
Bisexuality-related films
Italian comedy films
1980s Italian-language films
Italian black-and-white films
Films set in Sicily
Films set in Vatican City
Films directed by Dino Risi
Films scored by Manuel De Sica
1980s Italian films